Barent or Bernard Pietersz Fabritius (or Fabricius) (16 November 1624 [bapt.] – 20 October 1673 [buried]), was a Dutch painter.

Fabritius was born at Middenbeemster, North Holland, the son of Pieter Carelsz. Fabritius. He studied with his brothers Johannes and Carel Fabritius, and probably with Rembrandt as well. He was a painter of biblical subjects (The three angels before Abraham, The presentation in the temple), mythical and historical scenes, in addition to expressive portraits.  He died in Amsterdam.

Paintings

References 
Fabritius at Netherlands Institute for Art History
Barent Fabritius at PubHist

External links 
 

1624 births
1673 deaths
People from Beemster
Dutch Golden Age painters
Dutch male painters